Woodrow Thompson Fryman (April 12, 1940 – February 4, 2011), was an American professional baseball pitcher who played in Major League Baseball (MLB) for six teams, across 18 seasons (–). A two-time National League (NL) All-Star, he helped the Detroit Tigers reach the 1972 American League Championship Series and the Montreal Expos reach the 1981 National League Championship Series.

Pittsburgh Pirates
He went 12–9 with a 3.81 earned run average his rookie season, including three shutouts in a row against the Philadelphia Phillies, New York Mets and Chicago Cubs, respectively. His shutout against the Mets was nearly a perfect game, as Ron Hunt led off the Mets' half of the first inning with a single, and was immediately caught trying to steal second. Fryman retired the next 26 batters he faced without allowing another baserunner all game.

Following the season, he was dealt to the Philadelphia Phillies with Bill Laxton, Don Money and Harold Clem for Jim Bunning.

Philadelphia Phillies
After a complete-game victory against the San Francisco Giants on June 18, Fryman's record stood at 10–5 with a 1.61 ERA, and he was named the Phillies' sole representative at the 1968 All-Star Game. He dropped his next five decisions, and ended the season with a 12–14 record and 2.78 ERA.

In , Fryman was 4–10 with a 4.36 ERA for the 34–61 Phillies when the club placed him on waivers at the end of July.

Detroit Tigers
The Detroit Tigers were battling the Boston Red Sox for first place in the American League East when they claimed Fryman off waivers on August 2, 1972. Fryman turned his season around with the Tigers, and was 9–3 with a 2.21 ERA when the Red Sox came to Detroit for a three-game set to end the season a half game up on the Tigers.

Manager Billy Martin handed the ball to Mickey Lolich for the first game of the set. Lolich pitched a complete-game victory to put the Tigers up a half game on the Red Sox as Fryman took the mound for the second game of the set.

The Red Sox scored an unearned run in the first, and held onto a 1–0 lead until the Tigers clawed out a run off Luis Tiant in the sixth. They followed that up with two more runs in the seventh. Fryman, meanwhile, only allowed two hits after the first inning. After giving up a lead-off single in the eighth, he retired the next two batters he faced before turning the game over to Chuck Seelbach. Seelbach struck out two of the four batters he faced as Detroit beat the Red Sox 3–1 to clinch the division.

Fryman's .769 win percentage was tops in the American League in 1972, and his ERA+ of 154 is one of the highest in Detroit franchise history.

1972 ALCS
The Tigers lost the first game of the ALCS with the Oakland Athletics 3–2 in 11 innings. Fryman did not have his best stuff as he made the start in game two of the ALCS. He left them in the fifth inning behind 1–0 and the bases loaded. The bullpen allowed all three inherited runners to score as the A's cruised to a 5–0 victory, and a 2–0 lead in the ALCS.

Detroit came back to win the following two games in Tiger Stadium to take the series to five games. Fryman took the mound for the deciding game, as did his opponent from game two, Blue Moon Odom. Fryman pitched well, allowing two runs and just four hits over eight innings. One run was scored on a steal of home by Reggie Jackson, and the other was an unearned run, the result of a Dick McAuliffe error in the fourth. However, Oakland pitching was even better, as Odom and Vida Blue combined to allow just one unearned run to send the A's to the 1972 World Series.

Montreal Expos
Fryman spent two more seasons with the Tigers before being dealt to the Montreal Expos for Terry Humphrey and Tom Walker on December 4, . Along with Dave McNally from the Baltimore Orioles, he was the second left-handed pitcher acquired that day by the Expos which was devoid of southpaws for all but three weeks of the  1974 campaign.

Fryman's record stood at 8–6 with a 3.74 ERA when he earned his second All-Star nod in 1976. He was the Expos Player of the Year in 1976.

Cincinnati Reds
Fryman was traded with Dale Murray to the Cincinnati Reds for Tony Pérez and Will McEnaney on December 16, . He and Reds manager Sparky Anderson did not get along, and Fryman's record stood at 5–5 with a 5.38 ERA when he announced his retirement midway through the 1977 season. Following the season, he was lured back out of retirement, and dealt with Bill Caudill to the Chicago Cubs for Bill Bonham.

Return to Montreal
Fryman made just 13 appearances and was 2–4 with a 5.17 ERA for the Cubs when he was dealt to the Montreal Expos for a player to be named later (Jerry White) midway through the  season. Turning 39 at the start of the  season, Fryman was converted into a full-time relief pitcher by manager Dick Williams. He made the postseason for the second time in his career following the strike shortened 1981 season. In the 1981 National League Division Series against the Philadelphia Phillies, he pitched 1 inning, and gave up one earned run. In the 1981 National League Championship Series, he gave up four earned runs to the Los Angeles Dodgers in one inning pitched.

Fryman was 24–17 with 46 saves and a 2.73 ERA as a full-time reliever entering the  season. He made one appearance in April before going on the disabled list. Fryman recalled: "It was early in the 1983 season and my arm just popped and I couldn't even raise it." He returned to the club in July, but after going 0–3 with a 21.00 ERA, and blowing his only save opportunity, he retired.

Personal life
After his playing days, Fryman retired to his tobacco farm in Kentucky. Fryman was inducted into the Montreal Expos' Hall of Fame in 1995, and the Kentucky Sports Hall of Fame in 2005. On February 4, 2011, Fryman died in his hometown of Ewing, Kentucky.

Career stats

See also

Best pitching seasons by a Detroit Tiger
Detroit Tigers award winners and league leaders

References

Bob Dunn (June 30, 1975). “The Agony and the X Rays”.  Sports Illustrated. Archived from the original on August 7, 2018.

External links

Woodie Fryman at SABR (Baseball BioProject)

1940 births
2011 deaths
American expatriate baseball players in Canada
Baseball players from Kentucky
Batavia Pirates players
Chicago Cubs players
Cincinnati Reds players
Columbus Jets players
Detroit Tigers players
Major League Baseball pitchers
Montreal Expos players
National League All-Stars
People from Fleming County, Kentucky
Philadelphia Phillies players
Pittsburgh Pirates players